Deodatus Andreas Deddy Cahyadi Sunjoyo, (born 28 December 1974), commonly known as Deddy Corbuzier, is an Indonesian television presenter, actor, YouTuber and former mentalist. He is a recipient of the Merlin Award for "World's Best Mentalist" twice in a row. Deddy made his debut on television in 1998 with Impresario 008 on RCTI. He did many publicity stunts with many famous magicians. As an actor, Deddy starred in The Mentalist (2011). Deddy also wrote, directed, and starred in the action film Triangle The Dark Side (2016) 

Deddy is also known as a YouTuber. After his resignation from the magician world, Deddy now actively creates videos of his podcast titled "Close The Door" on his YouTube channel. As of November 2021, his YouTube channel has over 16 million subscribers and his videos have over 2.31 billion views.

Early life 
Deodatus Andreas Deddy Cahyadi Sunjoyo was born on 26 December 1974 in Jakarta, Indonesia, to Oemar Sundjojo (1934 – 1 January 2007) and Heniwaty (born 28 July 1935).

His father Sundjojo was born on 1934 in Banyuwangi, East Java, and worked as a microbus driver. Sundjojo died at Rumah Sakit Husada in Sawah Besar, Central Jakarta, on 1 January 2007 due to complications at the age of 73. His funeral was held at Tanah Kusir Cemetery on 4 January 2007. His mother Heniwaty was born on 28 July 1935 in Batavia, Dutch East Indies, and worked as a seamstress.

When Deddy Corbuzier was 8 years old, he saw a magician turning a handkerchief into a bouquet of flowers and was amazed. He then studied with several senior magicians to learn some simple magic tricks. However, he was not satisfied with this. At the age of 12, Deddy was determined to learn more difficult types of magic. He began his career by demonstrating several types of magic in Ancol Fantasy World, Jakarta.

Career 
Deddy's fame comes not only because of his profession as an actor, but also due to his well-known performances in Indonesia's entertainment industry. Aside from performing in many magic shows and talk shows on magic in various television stations, he has also starred in a number of both TV and print advertisements. Deddy has also acted in a number of soap operas as a guest star. His fame is sustained by his skills in enchanting the audience watching his act. Deddy often showcased magic tricks that present high risk. Although he is known as a magician, he prefers to be called a mentalist.

In the middle of 2013, Deddy "invented" his diet technique which he named "OCD" or "Obsessive Corbuzier Diet". This technique is based on Intermittent Fasting combined with HIIT (High Intensity Interval Training). Even though this is not a new technique, but it was well-known in Indonesia due to Deddy's successful body transformation from low fat content into muscles. Deddy also published a website and an electronic book talking about his transformation.

Deddy is now actively growing his YouTube Channel. He posts videos from his podcast "Close The Door" which contains conversations on the recent news in Indonesia. Deddy is known to invite interesting guest stars such as Novel Baswedan, Taufik Hidayat, and Syeikh Ali Jaber.

He appointed as the ambassador for the Ministry of Defense's Reserve Component Program on 13 October 2021. For his work with the Ministry for promoting the program, Minister of Defense Prabowo Subianto, appointed him as Brevet Lieutenant Colonel rank on 9 December 2022. His appointment was approved by Commander of the Indonesian Armed Forces General Andika Perkasa and Commander of the Indonesian Army General Dudung Abdurrachman.

Controversy

Massive homophobic attacks
In May 2022, Deddy Corbuzier received significant homophobic feedback on social media after having invited a famous gay couple in Indonesia to do a podcast. A few hours after Deddy Corbuzier uploaded the video, the topic of LGBT and the hashtag #UnsubscribeDeddyCorbuzier was trending on Indonesian Twitter. Deddy Corbuzier also received criticism from religious leaders in Indonesia. Even so, the video got more than 4.7 million views in just a day.

Filmography

Film

Soap Operas 

 Raja Sulap
 Tawa Sutra Coooyyy

Television 

 Impresario 008 (RCTI)
 After School (RCTI)
 Hitam Putih (Trans 7)
 World Record (Trans 7)
 Indonesia Mencari Bakat (Trans TV)
 The Master season 1–5 (RCTI)
 Deal Or No Deal Indonesia (ANTV)
 The Next Mentalist (Trans 7)
 Big Deddy (Global TV)
 My Games (Trans 7)
 The Magic Show (Trans TV)
 Sexy Magic (Trans TV)
 Magicomic Show (Indosiar)
 Jendela Ramadan Indonesia (NET.)
 Deddy's Corner (Trans TV)
 OOTD (Obrolan of the Day)  (Trans 7)
 Indonesia's Next Top Model (NET.)

Books 

 Mantra (2005)
 Book of Magic (2007)
 Seven Dark Secrets of Rubik's Cube  (2008)
 OCD: Obsessive Corbuzier's Diet (2013)
 Youtuber for Dummies (2018)
 Millennial Power (2019)

Awards and nominations

References

External links
 Deddy Corbuzier Menangis Lihat Video Sang Anak 
 
 

1976 births
Living people
Indonesian magicians
Indonesian people of Chinese descent
People from Jakarta
Indonesian Muslims
Converts to Sunni Islam from Catholicism
Indonesian YouTubers

Indonesian former Christians